Patch or Patches may  refer to:

Arts, entertainment and media
 Patch Johnson, a fictional character from Days of Our Lives
 Patch (My Little Pony), a toy
 "Patches" (Dickey Lee song), 1962
 "Patches" (Chairmen of the Board song), 1970, also covered by Clarence Carter
 Patch (website), an online news service
 "Patches", a song by Dala from the album Angels & Thieves

People 
 Patch Adams (Hunter Adams, born 1945), American physician and clown
 Alexander Patch (1889–1945), WWII U.S. Army general
 Harry Patch (1898–2009), WWI British veteran
 Horace Patch (1814–1862), American politician

Places 
 Patch, St. Louis, Missouri, U.S.
 Patch, Gwbert, Ceredigion, Wales

Science and technology

Computing 
 Patch (computing), changes to a computer program
 patch (Unix), a UNIX utility
 PATCH (HTTP), an HTTP request to make a change

Electronics 
 Autopatch or phone patch, from radio to telephone
 Patch antenna
 Patch cable, to connect devices
 Patch panel, to connect  circuits
 Swede Patch 2000, a guitar/synthesizer

Medicine
 Patch (dermatology), a large skin lesion
 Transdermal patch, medicated
 Eyepatch

Species
 Patch butterflies, species of the genus Chlosyne

Other uses 
 PATCH (Pembrokeshire Action To Combat Hardship), a UK charity
 Patch (firearms), for muzzleloaders
 In landscape ecology, a homogeneous area
 Compulsory figures in figure skating
 Contact patch, of a tire with a road 
 Embroidered patch
 Shoulder sleeve insignia (United States Army)
 Tactical recognition flash
 Gang patch, in New Zealand
 Surface patch

See also 
 
 
 Pach (disambiguation)
 Patch box (disambiguation)
 Coal town or coal patch, residences for miners near the coal mine
 Oil patch, the petroleum industry
 Patch collecting
 Patched, a protein receptor
 Patchwork, a form of needlework